The 2006 UCI Mountain Bike & Trials World Championships were held in Rotorua, New Zealand from 22 to 27 August 2006. The disciplines included were cross-country, downhill, four-cross, and trials. The event was the 17th edition of the UCI Mountain Bike World Championships and the 21st edition of the UCI Trials World Championships.

This was the first UCI Mountain Bike & Trials World Championships held in New Zealand and the second held in Oceania after the 1996 World Championships in Cairns, Australia.

A women's under-23 race was included in the UCI Mountain Bike & Trials World Championships for the first time in 2006 and was won by Ren Chengyuan from China. Julien Absalon of France and Gunn-Rita Dahle Flesjå of Norway each won their third consecutive elite cross-country world titles. Sam Hill became the first Australian to win the elite men's downhill world title.

Medal summary

Men's events

Women's events

Team events

Medal table

See also
2006 UCI Mountain Bike World Cup
UCI Mountain Bike Marathon World Championships

References

External links

 Results for the mountain-bike events on cyclingnews.com
 Results for the trials events on uci.ch

UCI Mountain Bike World Championships
International cycle races hosted by New Zealand
UCI Mountain Bike and Trials World Championships